Dhanaura is a constituency of the Uttar Pradesh Legislative Assembly covering the city of Dhanaura in the Amroha district of Uttar Pradesh, India.

Dhanaura is one of five assembly constituencies in the Amroha Lok Sabha constituency. Since 2008, this assembly constituency is numbered 39 amongst 403 constituencies.

Currently this seat belongs to Bharatiya Janata Party candidate Rajeev Tarara who won in last Assembly election of 2017 Uttar Pradesh Legislative Elections by defeating Samajwadi Party candidate Jagram Singh by a margin of 38,229 votes.

Members of Legislative Assembly

Election Results

2022

2017

2012

References

External links
 

 Official Site of Legislature in Uttar Pradesh
Uttar Pradesh Government website
UP Assembly

Assembly constituencies of Uttar Pradesh
Amroha district